In mathematics, the Natural transform is an integral transform similar to the Laplace transform and Sumudu transform, introduced by Zafar Hayat Khan in 2008. It converges to both Laplace and Sumudu transform just by changing variables. Given the convergence to the Laplace and Sumudu transforms, the N-transform inherits all the applied aspects of the both transforms. Most recently, F. B. M. Belgacem has renamed it the natural transform and has proposed a detail theory and applications.

Formal definition
The natural transform of a function f(t), defined for all real numbers t ≥ 0, is the function R(u, s), defined by:

 

Khan showed that the above integral converges to Laplace transform when u = 1, and into Sumudu transform for s = 1.

See also

References

Integral transforms